Angela Louise D'Audney (née Cerdan, 26 August 1944 – 6 February 2002) was a New Zealand television news anchor and actress. She was the first woman to regularly anchor nationwide news bulletins on New Zealand television in 1973, and continued presenting news regularly until 1997 and occasionally until 2001, when failing health forced her to leave her role at Television New Zealand.

Early life
Born Angela Louise Cerdan in London, her parents separated when she was a toddler. D'Audney spent the first few years of her life in Brazil with her Orthodox Jewish mother and sister before moving with her family to Auckland in the early 1950s. She was homeschooled and developed a love for languages. She became a naturalised New Zealand citizen in 1956, and married Haddo D'Audney in 1965; they were later divorced.

Career
D'Audney began her career in broadcasting at the New Zealand Broadcasting Corporation in 1962, working part-time as a continuity announcer, while studying microbiology at the University of Auckland. She gave up her studies to become a full-time broadcaster, moving on to national news presentation in 1973. Other roles included hosting the arts programme Kaleidoscope, and current events digest Eye Witness News. She also worked occasionally as an actress, and in 1982 shocked the public by appearing topless in the television comedy play The Venus Touch.  She continued as a current affairs presenter and occasional newsreader until 2001, gradually shifting her focus from television work to radio.

In May 2001, D'Audney was diagnosed with a brain tumour, which proved to be cancerous, and underwent an operation two weeks later. She died in February 2002 at the age of 57. During her last year, she wrote and published her autobiography, Angela: A Wonderful Life.

D'Audney is buried in the Jewish section of Waikumete Cemetery.

Legacy
After her death, the Angela D'Audney Trust was set up to raise funds for cancer treatment in New Zealand.

References

External links

Angela D'Audney at nzonscreen.com, includes several video clips

1944 births
2002 deaths
English emigrants to New Zealand
Naturalised citizens of New Zealand
English Jews
New Zealand radio presenters
New Zealand women radio presenters
New Zealand women television presenters
New Zealand television newsreaders and news presenters
New Zealand Jews
New Zealand people of English-Jewish descent
University of Auckland alumni
New Zealand autobiographers
Deaths from cancer in New Zealand
Burials at Waikumete Cemetery